Ingolf E. Rasmus (July 4, 1906 – July 20, 1996) was an American lawyer and politician.

Born in the Town of Eagle Point, Wisconsin, Chippewa County, Wisconsin, Rasmus went to Ripon College and then received his law degree from the University of Wisconsin Law School and then practiced law in Chippewa Falls, Wisconsin. In 1931, Rasmus served in the Wisconsin State Assembly and was a Republican.

Notes

1906 births
1996 deaths
People from Chippewa County, Wisconsin
Ripon College (Wisconsin) alumni
University of Wisconsin Law School alumni
Wisconsin lawyers
20th-century American politicians
20th-century American lawyers
Republican Party members of the Wisconsin State Assembly